Stade Nungesser was a multi-use stadium in Valenciennes, France.  It is currently used mostly for football matches and was the home stadium of Valenciennes FC through the 2010–11 season. The stadium is able to hold 16,457 people and was built in 1930. It was replaced as VAFC's main ground by the Stade du Hainaut in July 2011.

The stadium is named after the ace pilot Charles Nungesser, who was born in Valenciennes.

Nungesser
Valenciennes FC
Sports venues in Nord (French department)
Buildings and structures in Valenciennes
Sports venues completed in 1930
1930 establishments in France